This is a list of the 6 observers to the European Parliament for Estonia in the 1999 to 2004 session. They were appointed by the Estonian Parliament as observers from 1 May 2003 until the accession of Estonia to the EU on 1 May 2004.

List

Sources
Ministry of Foreign Affairs (in Latvian)

Estonia
2003
Estonia